Glendale Police Station, also known as Council House and Jail, is a historic building in Glendale, Ohio.  It was designed by architect H. Neill Wilson.  It was listed in the National Register on March 27, 1975.

References

Buildings and structures in Hamilton County, Ohio
Government buildings completed in 1871
Police stations on the National Register of Historic Places
Government buildings on the National Register of Historic Places in Ohio
National Register of Historic Places in Hamilton County, Ohio